Ysgafell Wen is a subsidiary summit of Allt-fawr in Snowdonia, North Wales. It is the highest point on a broad ridge that stretches to the north-west of Moel Druman, and includes two other summits, Ysgafell Wen North Top. and Ysgafell Wen Far North Top.

References

External links
 www.geograph.co.uk : photos of Ysgafell Wen and surrounding area

Beddgelert
Dolwyddelan
Mountains and hills of Conwy County Borough
Mountains and hills of Gwynedd
Mountains and hills of Snowdonia
Hewitts of Wales
Nuttalls